The 2015 UNAF Club Cup was the inaugural edition of the UNAF Club Cup. The clubs from Egypt, Libya, Morocco and Tunisia will face off for the title. Algeria withdrew its representative team because of overlapping dates of the competition with the Algerian championship.

Teams

Tournament
The competition played in a round-robin tournament determined the final standings. It's hosted in Casablanca, Morocco.

Standings

Matches

Champions

Statistics

Goalscorers

1 own goal
 Abdelhadi Zidane (playing against Club Africain)
 Wissem Ben Yahia (playing against Ismaily SC)

Media

Broadcasting

References

External links
كأس إتحاد شمال إفريقيا للأندية 2015 - UNAF official website

UNAF Club Cup
2015 in African football
2015–16 in Egyptian football
2015–16 in Libyan football
2015–16 in Moroccan football
2015–16 in Tunisian football